St. Joseph High School is located in St. Joseph, Michigan, United States.  It is the only public high school (grades 9–12) in the St. Joseph Public Schools district.

Athletics

 Baseball
 Basketball
Boys Champions: 1953, 1951, 1948, 1946, 1931, 1926
 Cheerleading
 Cross country
Boys State Champions: 1988
 Football 
 Golf
Boys State Champions: 1947, 1946, 1939
 Soccer
 Softball
 Swimming State Champions 2012
 Tennis
Boys State Champions: 2007, 1949, 1939
 Track and field
Boys State Champions: 1997, 1957, 1945, 1939, 1932, 1927 
Girls State Champions: 1979
 Volleyball
 Wrestling

Notable alumni
 Dave Carlock –  record producer, songwriter and multi-instrumentalist
 Nina Davuluri – Miss America 2014
 Rob Fredrickson – former NFL football player
 James Frey –  writer
 Ernie Koob – former MLB player (St. Louis Browns)
 Kenneth Marshall – actor
 Jay Schadler –  news reporter (Primetime and 20/20)
 Jordan Brewer – current professional baseball player (Houston Astros)
 Wesley French - current NFL player (Indianapolis Colts)

References

External links
 Main website
School district website

Public high schools in Michigan
Schools in Berrien County, Michigan